Jetset Magazine is an American lifestyle magazine founded in 2006, aimed at those with an affluent lifestyle. It is available as a quarterly print magazine and is distributed in private jets, private yachts, private jet terminals, yacht charters, exclusive resorts and events around the world. It is also available online with content created on a weekly basis.

Editors
 Darrin Austin - entrepreneur, venture capitalist, philanthropist
 Robert Kiyosaki – entrepreneur, author, Rich Dad Poor Dad 
 Daymond John – entrepreneur; founder, FUBU
 Barry LaBov – entrepreneur; chief executive officer
 Ken McElroy – real estate investor; author
 Tom Zenner – executive editor, Rylin Media; television sports anchor 
 Scott Walcheck – philanthropist and investor
 Tami Austin - editor-in-chief

Readership
The magazines targeted readership is the wealthiest one percent. The print magazine is circulated exclusively to private airport lounges, private yachts, exclusive events and travel locations. It is selective with advertisers to ensure it retains its target audience.

Covers
The magazine has featured many celebrities and entrepreneurs on the cover, with exclusive interviews. These include Richard Branson, Tom Hanks, Margot Robbie, Jackie Chan, Daniel Craig, Tom Cruise, Dwyane Wade, Donald Trump, Dwayne Johnson, Ryan Reynolds, Scarlett Johansson, Chris Hemsworth, Charlize Theron and Hugh Jackman.

Controversy
In 2014, the magazine interviewed and filmed Dana White in his office where he revealed he had a piece of art which contained cocaine and black tar heroin within it.

Famously, the magazine featured American presidential candidate Donald Trump on the cover of its issue 4 in 2015 with exclusive pictures from inside his private jet.

Miss Jetset
The magazine runs an annual competition to find "Miss Jetset". Women from all around the world compete, while raising awareness for the Andrew McDonough B+ Foundation, a children's cancer charity.
 2015 winner - Becca Tepper
 2016 winner - Laura Lydall
 2017 winner - Adaliz Martinez
 2018 winner - Lara Sebastian
 2019 winner - Enea Culverson
 2020 winner - Janeilla Burns
 2021 winner - Tanaya Peck

See also

 List of United States magazines

References

External links
 , the magazine's official website
 

2006 establishments in Arizona

Lifestyle magazines published in the United States
Quarterly magazines published in the United States
Visual arts magazines published in the United States
Design magazines
Entertainment magazines published in the United States
Magazines established in 2006
Magazines published in Arizona
Sailing magazines
Scottsdale, Arizona
Women's fashion magazines